The 2004 Croatian Football Super Cup was the sixth edition of the Croatian Football Super Cup, a football match contested by the winners of the previous season's Croatian First League and Croatian Football Cup competitions. The match was played on 17 July 2004 at Stadion Poljud in Split between 2003–04 Croatian First League winners Hajduk Split and 2003–04 Croatian Football Cup winners Dinamo Zagreb.

Match details

References 

 2004 Croatian Football Super Cup at HRnogomet.com

2004
HNK Hajduk Split matches
GNK Dinamo Zagreb matches
Supercup